The  is a home video game console that was produced by Takara (now Takara Tomy) in 1987. It uses special VHS tape-based footage that allows players to shoot targets with a ray gun.

Description 
The object of each game played using a VHS tape and a ray gun is to determine how many targets are hit at the end of the VHS tape. Takara ended production of the Video Challenger due to the success of the NES and the release of the TurboGrafx-16 and Genesis.

Hardware 
It uses only the gun known as the "Challenge Blaster". When the trigger is pulled together the muzzle to the target, combining with the image of the dedicated video software, the score is added.

Target with (usually score, high score, damage) the blinking pattern of three kinds. Score is displayed on the counter installed in the Challenge Blaster. When all targets in one round are successfully hit, player will enter a bonus round, which will double the number of points. Bonus round ends after a certain period of time.  If the muzzle is facing the damage pattern in the video without pulling the trigger, the score will be penalized.

List of titles released 
 Space Challenge (built-in game)
 Thunder Storm (Data East)
 Road Blaster (Data East)
 Godzilla Challenger 1 and 2
 Sky Wars (Original work by Publisher Select Merchandise Inc.)
 After Burner II (Sega)
 Turtle Challenge (based on the Teenage Mutant Ninja Turtles franchise)

Other 
Although it was exceptional existence , the image effect corresponding to the Video Challenger was added to the opening image Transformers: The Headmasters.

External links 
 Museum page by The Video Game Kraken
 Museum page by 20th Century Video Games
 Library Page at Videogame Console Library
 Video of Turtle Challenge

1980s toys
Takara Tomy
Video game consoles
Home video game consoles
Third-generation video game consoles
Products introduced in 1987